Söderort (literally "the southern place", sometimes translated to South Stockholm) is the southern suburban part of the Stockholm Municipality, Sweden. It is also part of the city of Stockholm.

Geography 
Söderort is located in the northern part of the Södertörn peninsula/island. The boroughs of Söderort are: Enskede-Årsta-Vantör, Farsta, Hägersten-Liljeholmen, Skärholmen, Skarpnäck and Älvsjö.

History 
The main part of Söderort was annexed by the City of Stockholm in 1913.

Before 2007, it was organized into eight stadsdelsområden: Enskede-Årsta, Farsta, Hägersten, Liljeholmen, Skarpnäck, Skärholmen, Vantör and Älvsjö.

Since 2007, Söderort is organized into six stadsdelsområden (sometimes translated to boroughs): Enskede-Årsta-Vantör, Farsta, Hägersten-Liljeholmen, Skarpnäck, Skärholmen, and Älvsjö.

Districts 

1/ km²2/ Population per hectare

See also
Stockholm City Centre
Västerort
Södertörn

References

External links

Geography of Stockholm
Suburbs in Europe